The 1963 West Bromwich by-election was a by-election held for the British House of Commons constituency of West Bromwich in Staffordshire on 4 July 1963.  It was won by the Labour Party candidate Maurice Foley.

Vacancy 
The seat had become vacant when the sitting Labour Member of Parliament (MP), John Dugdale had died at the age of 58 on 23 March 1963. He had held the seat since a by-election in 1941.

Candidates 
The Labour Party candidate was 37-year-old Maurice Foley. The Conservative candidate was Mr G. Hawkins, and the Liberal Party — which had not contested the seat since 1929 — fielded N. R. W. Mawle.

Result 
The result was a victory for the Labour candidate, Maurice Foley, who took the seat with a slightly increased share of the vote.  He held the seat until his resignation in 1973.

Votes

See also
West Bromwich (UK Parliament constituency)
West Bromwich
1941 West Bromwich by-election
1973 West Bromwich by-election
List of United Kingdom by-elections

Notes

Sources 
 British Parliamentary by-elections: West Bromwich 1963
 1959 general election results at Richard Kimber's political science resources

Politics of Sandwell
By-elections to the Parliament of the United Kingdom in West Midlands (county) constituencies
By-elections to the Parliament of the United Kingdom in Staffordshire constituencies
1963 in England
1963 elections in the United Kingdom
20th century in Staffordshire
July 1963 events in the United Kingdom